Vesterbro Pharmacy Danish: Vesterbro Apotek) operated from 1795 to 1992 in the Vesterbro district of Copenhagen, Denmark. Its former buildings on Vesterbrogade, one facing the street and two in the courtyard on the rear, were listed in 1972; all three date from the second half of the 19th century.

Two other, still active pharmacies are found in the Vesterbro area. One of them, Steno Apotek, is located on the same street Vesterbrogade 6C, across the street from Copenhagen Central Station. The other, Enghave Apotek, is located on Enghavevej at Enghave Plads.

History

The first building

The pharmacy was founded on 17 January 1795 by the chemist Johan Gottlieb Blau. It was then located on the other side of Vesterbrogade, approximately where Oehnschlægergade runs today. Blau later also opened Gammeltorv Pharmacy next to the city hall on the corner of Nytorv and Frederiksborggade.

The second building

The pharmacy moved to its current site in 1826. A new building was constructed there in 1854 to design by Peter Heinrich Christoph Hagemann. It was later expanded with a laboratory building to the rear by Peter Christian Bønecke in 1884. The pharmacy was for a while known as Ørne Apotek (literally "Eagles Pharmacy").

The building was listed in 1971. The pharmacy closed on 29 February 1992.

Current use

The owners of the high-profile cocktail bar Ruby on Gammel Strand opened the cocktail bar Lidkoeb in the former laboratory in the courtyard  building (Vesterbrogade 72B) in November 2012.

The ground floor of the building facing the street was converted into a Halifax burger restaurant in 2014–15. The transformation was undertaken by Over Byen Arkitekter.

List of chemists
The chemists were:
16.01.1795 - xx.xx.1796 Johan Gottlieb Blau
 10.11.1797 - xx.xx.1802 Wolfgang Andreas Resch
 16.11.1802 - 31.10.1805 Jacob Møller
 10.01.1806 - 30.09.1810 Jens Iskow Thaning
 04.12.1810 - 14.03.1829 Niels Møller
 14.03.1829 - 30.04.1832 Martha Cathrine f. Sorterup En
 10.07.1832 - 31.12.1863 Anders Madsen
 19.03.1864 - 17.06.1919 Hans Peter Madsen
 05.12.1912 - 09.02.1921 Erik Høst-Madsen (as co-owner)
 09.02.1921 - 30.09.1948 Erik Høst Madsen (as solo owner)
 15.09.1948 - 31.10.1965 Carl Richard Neergaard Jacobsen
 09.10.1965 Ole Frederik Carl Olsen(Bevilling ikke benyttet)
 01.11.1965 - 30.06.1966 Drevet af Apotekerfonden
 25.04.1966 - 28.02.1992 Sven-Erik Sandermann Olsen

See also
 Listed buildings in Copenhagen Municipality

References

External links
 Images
 Hans Peter Madsen
 Jacob Møller

Vesterbro, Copenhagen
Pharmacies in Copenhagen
Listed pharmacy buildings in Denmark
Retail companies established in 1795
Retail companies disestablished in 1992
1992 disestablishments in Denmark
Buildings and structures completed in 1854